3635 Kreutz, provisional designation , is a slowly rotating Hungaria asteroid and Mars-crosser from the innermost regions of the asteroid belt, approximately 3 kilometers in diameter. It was discovered on 21 November 1981, by Czech astronomer Luboš Kohoutek at the Calar Alto Observatory in southern Spain.

Orbit and classification 

Kreutz is a Mars-crossing asteroid, a member of a dynamically unstable group between the main belt and the near-Earth populations, crossing the orbit of Mars at 1.666 AU. It has also been classified as a member of the dynamical Hungaria group.

It orbits the Sun at a distance of 1.6–1.9 AU once every 2 years and 5 months (878 days). Its orbit has an eccentricity of 0.08 and an inclination of 19° with respect to the ecliptic. The body's observation arc begins with its official discovery observation as no precoveries were taken, and no prior identifications were made.

Physical characteristics 

In the SMASS classification, Kreutz is characterized as a common stony S-type asteroid.

Slow rotator 

In November 2012, a rotational lightcurve of Kreutz was obtained from photometric observations by American astronomer Brian Warner at his Palmer Divide Observatory in Colorado. Lightcurve analysis gave a rotation period of  hours with a brightness variation of 0.25 magnitude, superseding a previous result that gave 39 hours.

As most asteroids have a much shorter rotation period of 2 to 20 hours, Kreutzes period of 280 hours is among the Top 200 slow rotators known to exist.

Diameter and albedo 

According to the survey carried out by the NEOWISE mission of NASA's Wide-field Infrared Survey Explorer, Kreutz measures 2.94 kilometers in diameter and its surface has an albedo of 0.269, while the Collaborative Asteroid Lightcurve Link assumes a standard albedo for stony asteroids of 0.20 and calculates a diameter of 3.41 kilometers using an absolute magnitude of 14.7.

With a mean-diameter of approximately 3 kilometers, Kreutz is one of the smaller mid-sized Mars-crossing asteroids. It is assumed that there are up to 10 thousand Mars-crossers larger than 1 kilometer. The largest members of this dynamical group are 132 Aethra, 323 Brucia, 2204 Lyyli and 512 Taurinensis, which measure between 43 and 25 kilometers in diameter.

Naming 

This minor planet was named after Heinrich Kreutz (1854–1907), German astronomer at the Kiel Observatory and editor of the journal Astronomische Nachrichten, known for his study of bright sungrazing comets. The family of Kreutz sungrazers, fragments of a parent comet that broke up several centuries ago, is also named after him. The official naming citation was published by the Minor Planet Center on 26 November 2004.

Notes

References

External links 
 Asteroid Lightcurve Database (LCDB), query form (info )
 Dictionary of Minor Planet Names, Google books
 Asteroids and comets rotation curves, CdR – Observatoire de Genève, Raoul Behrend
 Discovery Circumstances: Numbered Minor Planets (1)-(5000) – Minor Planet Center

003635
003635
Discoveries by Luboš Kohoutek
Named minor planets
003635
003635
19811121